Anand Bhatia (born 23 January 1947) is an Indian former cricketer. He played first-class cricket for Delhi and Cambridge University between 1966 and 1969.

See also
 List of Delhi cricketers
 List of Cambridge University Cricket Club players

References

External links
 

1947 births
Living people
Indian cricketers
Delhi cricketers
Cambridge University cricketers
Cricketers from Lucknow